Julián Campo Sainz de Rozas (born 19 June 1938) is a Spanish politician who served as Minister of Public Works and Urbanism from December 1982 to July 1985.

References

1938 births
Living people
Complutense University of Madrid alumni
Government ministers of Spain
20th-century Spanish politicians